Actinopus pusillus is a species of mygalomorph spiders in the family Actinopodidae. It is found Brazil.

References

pusillus
Spiders described in 1920